Kateninovsky is a rural locality (a village) in Krasnoyarsky Selsoviet, Sterlitamaksky District, Bashkortostan, Russia. The population was 9 as of 2010. There are 6 streets.

Geography 
Kateninovsky is located 25 km northeast of Sterlitamak (the district's administrative centre) by road. Krasny Oktyabr is the nearest rural locality.

References 

Rural localities in Sterlitamaksky District